Eudorcas is a genus of antelope; the species are commonly called gazelles.  Eudorcas was originally considered a subgenus of the genus Gazella but has since been elevated to generic status. The five species within the genus Eudorcas are:

Species

Social structure and behavior 

The social structure of gazelles consists of several types of groups. Male gazelles are territorial throughout their adult lives, though not usually before two to three years of age. During the nonterritorial periods, males usually spend their time in bachelor groups or as part of a mixed herd. Likewise, females will form migratory female groups that travel through the males' territories. As the female groups pass through, the territorial males will try to herd them to prevent them from leaving. Adult males with adjoining territories will engage in combat several times a day, fighting with their horns to establish dominance and the boundaries of their territories. In this way, the accepted boundaries of the territory can change on a daily basis. If a lone male, a bachelor group, or in some cases even an adolescent male fawn of a female gazelle should be passing through a territorial male's region, the male will chase the offender out of his territory. This territoriality does not extend to males of other species.

References

 
 
True antelopes
Taxa named by Leopold Fitzinger
Mammal genera